Gary Keller  (born October 7, 1953) is a jazz and classical saxophonist, recording artist,  a  lecturer at the Frost School of Music at the University of Miami, and a Conn-Selmer Artist. He has played with Woody Herman, Frank Sinatra, and Jaco Pastorius, among many over a career spanning more than four decades. He appears on numerous recordings. He has performed in the pit of Broadway orchestras and for television shows.

Biography

Gary Keller holds a Bachelor of Music (B.M.) degree from the State University of New York at Fredonia He received his Master of Music (M.M.). from the Frost School of Music at the University of Miami. Keller has studied under Joe Allard, David Liebman, Pat LaBarbera, and Bob Mover among others. He has been a professor at Frost since 1982.

Career
Keller is the founder of the Miami Saxophone Quartet. He is a member of the South Florida Jazz Orchestra. He has performed at clubs and jazz festivals, and lectured about jazz and music performance at colleges and universities in the United States, Japan, and Europe. numerous national and international recordings, television shows, Broadway pit orchestras.

Keller made his debut solo recording in 1999, Blues For An Old New Age. Saxophone Journal has called Keller an "admired and respected as a virtuoso performer and world class educator.” 

“Keller’s tunes are an exemplary bunch…A thinkers delight…extremely well done,” according to The Penguin Guide to Jazz on CD.  He appeared on the July/August 2002 cover of Saxophone Journal, a trade publication.

He lectures and teaches at schools around the world, and has been an Artist in Residence at the Johannes Gutenberg-Universität, Mainz and has taught and performed at the Thomas Jefferson Institute, the University of Brasilia, Brasilia, Brazil, and the IASJ Summer Workshop at the Souza Lima Conservatory in São Paulo, Brazil, among others.

Performed with

Keller has appeared with numerous jazz artists including:

 Manny Album
 David Baker
 Tony Bennett
 Natalie Cole
 Vic Damone
 Michael Feinstein
 Clare Fischer
 Billy Hart
 Woody Herman
 Dave Liebman
 Johnny Mathis
 Chico O'Farrill
 Jaco Pastorius
 Jim McNeely
 Adam Nussbaum
 Lou Rawls
 Troy Roberts
 Lupa Santiago
 Maria Schneider
 Frank Sinatra
 Dr. Lonnie Smith
 Ira Sullivan
 Mel Torme
 Rosanna Vitro
 Kenny Werner
 Kenny Wheeler

Bands and combos
Keller has appeared with numerous big bands and combos:

 American Jazz Philharmonic
 Alan Baylock Big Band
 Drive By Big Band
 Woody Herman Thundering Herd
 The Jaco Pastorius Big Band
 Miami Saxophone Quartet
 Rosanna Vitro Quartet
 Word of Mouth Revisited Big Band
 Stephen Guerra Big Band
 University of Miami Concert Jazz Band

Classical performances

Keller has performed/recorded classical works with:

 Chamber Music Palm Beach
 Festival Orchestra of Santo Domingo
 Florida Philharmonic
 Frost Symphony Orchestra
 New World Symphony
 Naples Philharmonic
 St. Petersburg (Russia) Philharmonic

Clubs and venues
Blue Note Jazz Club, Tokyo, Japan
Hard Rock Live, Hollywood, Florida

Jazz festivals
 Montreux Jazz Festival Japan, 2011
 Rochester Jazz Festival, 2010 - with the Miami Saxophone Quartet
 Scranton Jazz Festival, 2012

As author
Keller is the author of The Jazz Chord/Scale Handbook (Advance Music), an advanced-level music book on jazz chord progressions and scales.

Discography
 Fourtified - Miami Saxophone Quartet (2008)
 Midnight Rumba - Miami Saxophone Quartet with special guests Arturo Sandoval and Jon Secada (2005)
 Miami Saxophone Quartet Live - Miami Saxophone Quartet  (2003)
 Take Four Giant Steps - Miami Saxophone Quartet (2002)
 Blues For An Old New Age (1999) - Double-Time Records
With Gerry Mulligan
Walk on the Water (DRG, 1980)

References

American jazz saxophonists
American male saxophonists
1953 births
Living people
21st-century American saxophonists
21st-century American male musicians
American male jazz musicians
Double-Time Records artists